Gaicht Pass (el. 1093 m.) is a high mountain pass in the Alps in Tyrol in Austria.

It connects the valley of the Lech near Weißenbach an der Lech with the Tannheim valley near Nesselwängle. It is crossed by federal highway B 199, which runs along the Haldensee and over the Oberjoch Pass in Germany.

History
This pass was important in the Middle Ages as a commercial route.

The bridge built in 1912 was destroyed by the retreating German army in 1945. It was replaced in 1979.

See also
 List of highest paved roads in Europe
 List of mountain passes

Mountain passes of Tyrol (state)
Mountain passes of the Alps